MAC service data unit (media access control service data unit, MSDU) is the service data unit that is received from the logical link control (LLC) sub-layer which lies above the media access control (MAC) sub-layer in a protocol stack. The LLC and MAC sub-layers are collectively referred to as the data link layer (DLL).

See also
 MAC protocol data unit
 Packet segmentation
 Packet aggregation

External links 
 802.11 Wireless LAN IEEE standard

Media access control